Sir Loin, sirloin, or variant, may refer to:

Sir Loin

Food
 sirloin (UK), a cut of meat
 sirloin (US), a cut of meat from the (UK) rump steak
 Sir Loin, a knighted cut of beef, see sirloin#Etymology
 King James I of England's cut of beef, see Hoghton Tower
 King Charles II of England's cut of beef, see Chingford#Landmarks
 King Charles II of England's cut of beef, see Friday Hill, London

People
 Larry Lamb (newspaper editor) (1929-2000) UK newspaper editor, while working as a journalist at "The Australian", was nicknamed Sir Loin

Characters
 Sir Loin (mascot) an Angus Beef character mascot for the indoor football team of American football, the Omaha Beef

Fictional characters
 Sir Loin, a fictional character created by Thomas Hervey as the child of Father Christmas
 Sir Loin (fictional knight), a fictional character from the Japanese manga series Fighting Foodons
 Sir Loin (fictional bodyguard), a fictional character from the webseries New Stage
 Sir Loin (anthropomorphic steak), a fictional character from the webseries Oscar's Hotel for Fantastical Creatures
 Sir Loin (weasel), a fictional character from the French children's series Dynamo Duck
 Sir Loin of Beef (fictional title), a fictional title for the Sheriff of Nottingham from the Bugs Bunny cartoon Rabbit Hood
 Sir Loin of Beef (fictional knight), a fictional black knight from the Bugs Bunny cartoon Knighty Knight Bugs
 Sir Loin of Lamb (fictional knight), a fictional character from the UK children's cartoon Henry's Cat
 Sir Loin of Worcester (Knights of the Round Table), a fictional character from the 1960s radio play "Camelot" off the anthology radio series I'm Sorry, I'll Read That Again, see ISIRTA plays, A-C

Sirloin

Food
 Sirloin (US), a cut of steak taken from the top of the (UK) rump steak 
 Sirloin (UK), a cut of meat, from between the ribs and the pelvis
 Top sirloin (UK), a sirloin missing the tenderloin and bottom
 Bottom sirloin (UK), a sirloin missing the top sirloin
 Sirloin tip (UK), a triangular cut taken from the bottom sirloin

Other
 Super Sirloin, an episode of Aqua Teen Hunger Force

See also

 
 
 
 Sir-Loin-A-Lot, a fictional item from the Simpsons episode Maximum Homerdrive
 To Sirloin with Love, an episode of King of the Hill
 Sirloin
 Loin
 Sir (disambiguation)
 Striploin
 Tenderloin (disambiguation)